The American Society of Cinematographers Spotlight Award is an annual award given by the American Society of Cinematographers to cinematographers working in features and documentaries that are typically screened at film festivals, in limited theatrical release, or outside the United States. It was first awarded in 2014.

Winners and nominees

2010s

2020s

References

American Society of Cinematographers Awards
Awards for best cinematography